State Road 206 (SR 206) is a  2-lane-wide, state highway completely within St. Johns County in the northeastern part of the U.S. state of Florida. It extends from SR 207 south-southwest of Spuds to SR A1A in Crescent Beach, two blocks west of the Atlantic Ocean. Speed limits on portions of the state road exceeds .

Route description

SR 206 begins at an intersection with SR 207 in Spuds, near Deep Creek, a small tributary of the St. Johns River. From there, SR 206 travels east through uninhabited farmland, crossing Interstate 95 (I-95). East of I-95, the road is mostly uninhabited, but establishments slowly emerge, especially east of US 1 in Dupont Center. SR 206 continues east through a partially established residential area before crossing the Intracoastal Waterway, entering Crescent Beach and terminating at SR A1A.

Major intersections

See also
 
 
 List of state roads in Florida

References

206
206